Joseph Arthaud (13 June 1813 – 17 March 1883), was a French psychiatrist, physician and professor.

Life 
Joseph Arthaud was of an unknown father. His mother, who was a manager of an embroidery workshop in Lyon, brought him up and encouraged his studies. Being too young to be accepted in philosophy class at Collège-lycée Ampère, he attended the medical school, then did his philosophy in 1828.
He married Marie Girard (1814-1891) in 1838, they had four children, Françoise, Pothin, Claude and Emmanuel.

Published works 
 Du siège et de la nature des maladies mentales. (Thèse). Édition, Paris, 22 août 1835
 Examen médico-légal des faits relatifs au procès criminel de Jobard, Paris, V. Masson, 1852
 Observations de crétinisme, Lyon,  impr.  A. Vingtrinier, 1854
 Réflexions sur l'état mental de C. Feuillet, condamné par la cour d'assises pour crimes d'empoisonnement, Lyon, impr. A. Vingtrinier, 1854
 Relation d'une hystéro-démonopathie épidémique observée à Morzine (Haute-Savoie), Lyon, impr. A. Vingtrinier, seconde édition, 1862
 De la possibilité et de la convenance de faire sortir certaines catégories d'aliénés des asiles spéciaux et de les placer soit dans des exploitations agricoles, soit dans leurs propres familles, lu au Congrès médical de Lyon, le 1er octobre 1864, Lyon, impr. Vingtrinier, 1865
 De l'état mental des épileptiques au point de vue médico-légal, Lyon,  impr. A. Vingtrinier, 1867
 De l'Assistance publique des malades à domicile et dans les hôpitaux, Lyon, impr. A. Vingtrinier, 1868
 Du Bromure de potassium dans le traitement de l'épilepsie, Lyon,  impr. A. Vingtrinier, 1870
 L'Asile départemental de Bron, Lyon, impr. A. Vingtrinier, 1874

1813 births
1883 deaths
19th-century French physicians
French psychiatrists
Physicians from Lyon